The 2002 Korean League Cup, also known as the Adidas Cup 2002, was the 16th competition of the Korean League Cup.

Group stage

Group A

Group B

Knockout stage

Bracket

Semi-finals

Final

Seongnam Ilhwa Chunma won 4–2 on aggregate.

Awards

Source:

See also
2002 in South Korean football
2002 K League
2002 Korean FA Cup

References

External links
Official website
RSSSF

2002
2002
2002 domestic association football cups
2002 in South Korean football